Jayam Kondaan ( The Victor) is a 2008 Tamil romantic action film directed and written by Kannan and produced by T. G. Thiyagarajan, Selvi Thiyagarajan,Sendhil Thyagarajan and T. Arjun. It stars Vinay, Bhavana and Lekha Washington while Vivek, Santhanam, Kishore, Vasundhara Kashyap, Malavika Avinash, and Nizhalgal Ravi, among others, play supporting roles. 

The film revolves around an NRI civil engineer who returns to Chennai from London to set up his own business. He feels that if one has to reach his goal in life, it is better to win over your enemies and take them along with you. He finds out that his late father had another family, and that his stepsister wants to steal his home. After clashes with his sister, he discovers another tragedy involving someone who wants to make a vendetta with the family. The film follows the sibling relationship and the threat from the avenger.

The film opened to worldwide audiences after several delays on 29 August 2008 to generally positive reviews.

Plot
Arjun (Vinay) is an IT professional who resigns his job in London and returns to India, following his father's sudden death. He decides to set up a real estate business in Chennai from the funds he has saved so far. He goes to the bank to withdraw the money, but is shocked to see that only Rs.18,000 is available in his account. He estimated the amount to be Rs.65 lakhs. Arjun doubts that his father must have invested the money somewhere in India. He inquires with his father's friends to get to know about the money. At last, Arjun finds that his father has purchased a house in Madurai with the money, but also is shocked to know that his father had another wife named Chandrika (Malavika Avinash), who is a French teacher and has a daughter named Brinda (Lekha Washington) through her.

Brinda gets admission to study in MIT in the US, but her education loan is rejected. She decides to sell the house in Madurai and get the money needed for her education. Arjun comes to meet Chandrika and Brinda, asking Brinda not to sell the property as it was purchased through his money. Chandrika understands that her daughter's activities are not right and the house should belong to Arjun. Brinda is short tempered and does not listen to Chandrika. Chandrika hands over the house documents to Arjun, and he leaves to Madurai to sell the house.

At Madurai, he meets Durai Raj (Nizhalgal Ravi), a chilli vendor, and his daughter Annapurani (Bhavana), who are the tenants. Durai is a friend of Arjun's father. Arjun explains his situation and requests them to vacate the home so that he can sell. To convince Annapoorani, Arjun cooks up a story that both Annapoorani and Arjun are childhood friends. To his surprise, Brinda comes to Madurai to prevent Arjun from selling the property. She approaches Guna (Kishore), a local goon, to help her from stopping Arjun. Guna comes along with his wife Poongodhai (Vasundhara Kashyap) to the registrar office to stop the deal. A quarrel erupts between Arjun and Guna, and when Guna tries to hit Arjun with a hammer, Arjun hits the hammer's head, which ends up hitting Poongodhai, and she dies. This angers Guna, and he wants to kill Arjun.

Arjun escapes to Chennai with Brinda, but Chandrika passes away, and Brinda has no one to care for. Arjun takes Brinda to his home and asks her to stay with him, and she hesitantly agrees. Slowly, Arjun develops affection towards Brinda and decides to give the money to her for education. Annapurani comes to Chennai for a volleyball match, and love blossoms between her and Arjun. To Arjun's surprise, Arjun and Annapurani were really childhood friends and were so close during childhood. Arjun decides to leave to London and join his previous job as Guna keeps searching for him. On the day of Arjun's flight to London, Guna kidnaps Brinda. Arjun comes back from the airport to rescue Brinda, and in the fight, Guna gets killed. Brinda realizes her mistake and gets close with Arjun. Finally Brindha, Annapurni, and Arjun unite.

Cast

Vinay as Arjun Sekhar, an IT professional returning from London.
Bhavana as Annapurani, the daughter of Durai Raj, who lives in Arjun's ancestral house.
Lekha Washington as Brinda Sekhar, the illegitimate daughter of Arjun's father who wants to sell the ancestral house.
Kishore as Guna, a rowdy in Madurai who begins to clash with Arjun.
Vivek as Gopal, Arjun's friend.
Malavika Avinash as Chandrika, Brinda's mother who is a French teacher.
Nizhalgal Ravi as Durai Raj, a chilli vendor who lives in Arjun's family house and Annapurani's father.
Saranya Mohan as Archana, Annapurani's sister.
Vasundhara Kashyap as Poongodhai, Guna's wife.
Santhanam as Bhavani, a chilli broker in Madurai.
Krishna as Krishna, Arjun's friend.
Cochin Haneefa as Kasi, Arjun's neighbor.
Meera Krishnan as Annapurani's mother
Livingston as Police Officer
Devan Ekambaram as Devan, Arjun's friend and lawyer.
Deepa Venkat as Aruna, Gopal's wife.
Mekha Rajan as Meera Krishna, Krishna's wife.
Aarthi as Sindha Mani
Mayilsamy as Advocate
Thalaivasal Vijay as Poongodhai's father
Kamala Krishnaswamy as Apartment President
George Maryan
Vatsala Rajagopal
R. S. Shivaji
Suja Varunee (special appearance in 'Ore Or Naal En')

Reception
The film received positive reviews and lauded by critics for its simplicity in its presentation. The film was described by Sify.com as a "breezy entertainer", with the reviewer taking a liking to the film, comparing Jayamkondaan to the films Run, Sandakozhi and the Malayalam film Kireedom. The script and direction is described as "successful due to straightforward narration and packaging". Lekha Washington's performance was praised, citing that she "sparkles as the half sister in a well etched role" and is "the surprise packet and has the credentials to make it big". Vinay "looks too thin and fragile" but "adds to the film's energy", while Bhavana has nothing much to do other than "looking prim and proper". Out of the comedians, Sify reports that Krishna and Santhanam were more effective than Vivek who at times you feel speaks more dialogues than necessary. Praise is also heaped on Athisaya as the small town girl who gets enamored by the rowdy, describing her as a "revelation", while Kishore "fits the bill as the bad guy".

In unison, Rediff.com also praise the film as a "nice blend of the cinematic and logic".
The reviewer describes Vinay, "as the protagonist is very comfortable in his role" and thathe has "expressive eyes, emotes well, and makes sure his audience isn't disappointed. However Lekha Washington is clearly the surprise package", echoing Sify.com's views. However it claims that Bhavana, with her "soulful eyes and acting talent, could have done with a meatier role". "The film has risen above the clichés as per the review of The Hindu and the reviewer has praised Vinay for choosing this film as his second project".

Critics claimed that Kannan deserves credit for a "good job" on his story and screenplay.
Vidayasagar's music was described as is "so-so", there is a feeling that you have heard these tunes before with the "picturisation is nowhere near the high standards set up by the director's guru (Mani Ratnam). Rediff claims that Balasubramaniam's camera makes sure the "viewers aren't treated to bizarre angles" and that V. T. Vijayan's editing is "slick and smooth".

Soundtrack

The film has six songs composed by Vidyasagar. The audio of the film released worldwide on 3 June 2008, two months prior to the release. The soundtrack was successfully received with praise.

References

External links
 
 

2008 films
2000s Tamil-language films
Films scored by Vidyasagar
Indian drama films
2008 directorial debut films
Films directed by R. Kannan
Films shot in Uzbekistan